Little Schoharie Creek is a river in Schoharie and Albany counties in the state of New York. It converges with the Schoharie Creek in Middleburgh.

Hydrology

Discharge
The United States Geological Survey (USGS) maintains stream gauges along Little Schoharie Creek.

References 

Rivers of New York (state)